Air Defense Sector may refer to:

Regional air defense sectors
Eastern Air Defense Sector (1956—1966, 1987—), headquartered at Griffiss Business and Technology Park, the former Griffiss Air Force Base, in Rome, New York
Southwest Air Defense Sector (1987–1994), an inactive United States Air Force organization, last headquartered at March Air Force Base, California
Southeast Air Defense Sector (1987–2006), a unit of the US Air Force, last headquartered at Tyndall Air Force Base near Panama City, Florida
Western Air Defense Sector (1958–), a unit of the Washington Air National Guard, headquartered at Joint Base Lewis-McChord, Tacoma, Washington

Air defense sectors named for metropolitan areas

Canada
Goose Air Defense Sector (1963-1966), last headquartered at Goose Air Force Base, Labrador, Canada

United States
(by state)
Phoenix Air Defense Sector (1960-1966), last headquartered at Luke Air Force Base, Arizona
San Francisco Air Defense Sector (1959–1963), last headquartered at Beale Air Force Base, California
Denver Air Defense Sector (1959), a SAGE sector in the Rocky Mountain division, Colorado
Sioux City Air Defense Sector (1961–1966), last headquartered at Sioux City Air Force Station, Iowa
Bangor Air Defense Sector (1958–1966), last headquartered at Topsham Air Force Station, Maine
Albuquerque Air Defense Sector (1950, 1960), last headquartered at Kirtland Air Force Base, New Mexico
Detroit Air Defense Sector (1957–1966), last headquartered at Custer Air Force Station, Michigan
Sault Sainte Marie Air Defense Sector (1958–1966), last headquartered at K.I. Sawyer Air Force Base, Michigan
Duluth Air Defense Sector (1959–1966), last headquartered at Duluth Airport, Minnesota
Kansas City Air Defense Sector (1961–1962), last headquartered at Richards-Gebaur Air Force Base, Missouri
Great Falls Air Defense Sector (1959-1966), last headquartered at Malmstrom Air Force Base, Montana
Reno Air Defense Sector (1959–1966), last headquartered at Stead Air Force Base, Nevada
Boston Air Defense Sector (1956-1966), last headquartered at Hancock Field, New York
Syracuse Air Defense Sector (1956–1963), last headquartered at Hancock Field, New York
Grand Forks Air Defense Sector (1957-1963), last headquartered at Grand Forks Air Force Base, North Dakota
Minot Air Defense Sector (1959-1963), last headquartered at Minot Air Force Base, North Dakota
Oklahoma City Air Defense Sector (1960–1966), last headquartered at Oklahoma City Air Force Station, Oklahoma
Portland Air Defense Sector (1948-1966), last headquartered at Adair Air Force Station, Oregon
Washington Air Defense Sector (1956–1966), headquartered at Fort Lee Air Force Station, Virginia
Spokane Air Defense Sector (1958–1963), last headquartered at Larson Air Force Base, Washington
Chicago Air Defense Sector (1957–1966), last headquartered at Truax Field, Wisconsin

See also
 Air Defense Command